Ceuthostoma is a genus of two species of trees, constituting part of the plant family Casuarinaceae.

They grow naturally only in Malesia, in the islands of Palawan, Borneo, Halmahera and New Guinea.

Species 
 Ceuthostoma palawanense  – (known only (endemic) from the islands of Palawan in the SW Philippines, stretching towards Borneo)
 Ceuthostoma terminale  – (Borneo, Halmahera and New Guinea)

Notes

 
Fagales genera